The Baku World Challenge was an international motorsport competition in Baku, Azerbaijan, held on a temporary street circuit on closed public roads.

History

2012
In 2012, the City Challenge GmbH organized a stand-alone event for GT3-spec cars in Baku. It was called City Challenge Baku. The races were held on a  street circuit around the Government House. Gymkhana drifters and entertainment activities were the supporting program. According to the promoter, the event had 42,000 visitors.

2013
In 2013, the finale of the FIA GT Championship was held in Baku as Baku World Challenge. The series used a new street circuit close to the Baku Crystal Hall and the National Flag Square. The event was organized by Jean-François Chaumont and the former Formula 1 driver Thierry Boutsen.

2014
The Baku World Challenge was the last race of the Blancpain Sprint Series in 2014. The event was discontinued following the announcement that Formula One would hold a street race in Baku from 2016.

Previous winners

Lap records

The official race lap records at the Baku World Challenge are listed as:

References

Links
Official Baku World Challenge homepage
Baku World Challenge on Facebook
Baku World Challenge press information
Official Baku City Challenge homepage
Map and circuit history at RacingCircuits.info

Motorsport venues in Azerbaijan
Auto races in Azerbaijan
Recurring sporting events established in 2012
Recurring events disestablished in 2014
Defunct motorsport venues
Defunct sports competitions
Sports competitions in Baku
Autumn events in Azerbaijan